Nothofagus dombeyi, Dombey's beech, coigue, coihue or coigüe (from Mapudungun koywe) is a tree species native to southern Chile and the Andean parts of Argentine Patagonia. It is a fast-growing species that can live in a wide range of climatic conditions, and forms dense forests. It is cultivated for its timber, and as an ornamental subject.

Description
One tree, felled by a storm in 1954, reportedly measured  in diameter at the height of a man's chest and a total volume, including the branches, of 87 m³.

The coihue usually has elegant branches which are flattened horizontally. The leaves are evergreen, small (25–40 mm long and 10–16 mm wide), thick, coriaceous (leathery) and lustrous, dark green, with toothed borders and an acute apex; they have a very small, rounded and rhomb-shaped petiole. The tree is hermaphroditic; male and female flowers are grouped in the same tree, and pollen is spread by wind action. The flowers, measuring less than 5 mm, are insignificant. The fruit is a triangular nut measuring about 4–7 mm.

Etymology
The name of the tree is often spelled coigüe (reflecting the common Spanish pronunciation with an epenthetic g). Other related trees named coihue are the Coihue de Magallanes (Nothofagus betuloides), and the Coihue de Chiloé (Nothofagus nitida).

The Latin specific epithet dombeyi honours the French botanist Joseph Dombey (1742-1794).

Distribution and habitat
It forms dense forests such as those found in the Los Alerces and Nahuel Huapi national parks. It thrives in low hills with gentle slopes, being very demanding of water and soil; the largest forests are found on south-facing slopes, and the healthier specimens tend to grow on the banks of rivers and lakes. It sometimes forms mixed forests with Araucaria araucana (monkey-puzzle) trees, for example in the Villarrica National Park in Chile.

Uses
Coihue timber is considered excellent. In Argentina its exploitation is limited by the presence of the best forests within national parks. The wood is bright grayish white; the heartwood is a pale pink-white, which darkens after cut. Its texture is very fine and makes it easy to work with. It has a beautiful engraving, is semi-heavy, hard, durable and decay resistant. It is used in furniture, barrels, floors and building.

Nothofagus dombeyi has been introduced as an ornamental tree for parks and large gardens in the British Isles where it has gained the Royal Horticultural Society’s Award of Garden Merit. It has also been introduced to the North Pacific Coast of the United States. It requires an acid pH soil which is fertile and reliably moist.

Gallery

References

Further reading
Libro del Árbol: Especies Forestales Indígenas de la Argentina de Aplicación Industrial (edited by Celulosa Argentina S. A., Buenos Aires, October 1975)
Donoso, C. 2005. Árboles nativos de Chile. Guía de reconocimiento. Edición 4. Marisa Cuneo Ediciones, Valdivia, Chile. 136p.
Hoffmann, Adriana. 1998. Flora Silvestre de Chile, Zona Central. Edición 4. Fundación Claudio Gay, Santiago. 254p.
Rodríguez, R. & Quezada, M. 2003. Fagaceae. En C. Marticorena y R. Rodríguez [eds.], Flora de Chile Vol. 2(2), pp 64–76. Universidad de Concepción, Concepción.

External links

Nothofagaceae
Flora of the Andes
Flora of central Chile
Flora of Argentina
Trees of Argentina
Trees of Chile
Flora of the Valdivian temperate rainforest
Least concern plants
Least concern biota of South America
Garden plants of South America
Ornamental trees
Fagales of Argentina
Fagales of Chile